The 2014–15 Czech Cup, known as the Česká Pošta Cup for sponsorship reasons, is the 22nd season of the annual knockout football tournament of the Czech Republic. It began with the preliminary round on 20 July 2014 and end with the final on 26 May 2015. The winner of the cup will gain the right to play in the third qualifying round of the 2015–16 UEFA Europa League.

Preliminary round
The preliminary round ties are scheduled for 20 July 2014. 52 teams compete in this round, all from level 4 or below of the Czech league system.

|-
!colspan="3" style="background:#ccccff;"|19 July 2014

|-
!colspan="3" style="background:#ccccff;"|20 July 2014

|}

First round
The first round ties are scheduled for 26 July 2014.

|-
!colspan="3" style="background:#ccccff;"|26 July 2014

|-
!colspan="3" style="background:#ccccff;"|27 July 2014

|-
!colspan="3" style="background:#ccccff;"|29 July

|}

Second round
The second round ties are scheduled for 12, 13, 19, 20 August & 2 September 2014.

|-
!colspan="3" style="background:#ccccff;"|12 August 2014

|-
!colspan="3" style="background:#ccccff;"|13 August 2014

|-
!colspan="3" style="background:#ccccff;"|19 August 2014

|-
!colspan="3" style="background:#ccccff;"|20 August 2014

|-
!colspan="3" style="background:#ccccff;"|2 September 2014

|}

Third round
The third round ties are scheduled for 3, 5, 6, 7, 9, 10, 24 September and 8 October 2014.

|-
!colspan="3" style="background:#ccccff;"|3 September 2014

|-
!colspan="3" style="background:#ccccff;"|5 September 2014

|-
!colspan="3" style="background:#ccccff;"|6 September 2014

|-
!colspan="3" style="background:#ccccff;"|7 September 2014

|-
!colspan="3" style="background:#ccccff;"|9 September 2014

|-
!colspan="3" style="background:#ccccff;"|10 September 2014

|-
!colspan="3" style="background:#ccccff;"|24 September 2014

|-
!colspan="3" style="background:#ccccff;"|8 October 2014

|}

Fourth round
The fourth round ties were played on 23, 24 and 30 September, 8, 9, 14 and 29 October, 4, 5, 18 and 19 November and 4 December 2014. 

|}

Quarter-finals
Quarter-final matches were played on 31 March and 14 April 2015.

|}

Semi-finals
Semifinal matches were played on 28/29 April and 12 May 2015.

|}

Final
The final was played at Mladá Boleslav City Stadium on 27 May 2015.

See also
 2014–15 Czech First League
 2014–15 Czech National Football League

References

Czech Cup seasons
Cup
Czech Cup